Tulsa Spirit is an American women’s soccer team, founded in 2008. The team is a member of the Women's Premier Soccer League, the third tier of women’s soccer in the United States and Canada. The team plays in the North bracket of the Southwest Division. On Feb.21, 2014 the Major Arena Soccer League team the Tulsa Revolution (mens) announced the formation of a partnership with the Tulsa Spirit. That partnership dissolved following the folding of the Revolution.

The team plays its home games at the Case Soccer Complex at Oral Roberts University in the city of Tulsa, Oklahoma. The club's colors are red, white and blue.

Players

Current roster

Notable former players

Year-by-year

Honors

Competition history

Coaches
  Head Coach Ali Adibi Asst. Coach Paldin Khodabandeh 2014-2016

Stadia
 Case Soccer Complex at Oral Roberts University, Tulsa, Oklahoma 2015–present

Average attendance

External links
 Official Site
 WPSL Tulsa Spirit page

Women's Premier Soccer League teams
Women's soccer clubs in Oklahoma
2007 establishments in Oklahoma
Sports in Tulsa, Oklahoma